"The New Laird of Castle Mcduck" is a 1993 Scrooge McDuck comic by Don Rosa. It is the fifth of the original 12 chapters in the series The Life and Times of Scrooge McDuck. The story takes place in 1885.

The story was first published in the Danish Anders And & Co. #1993-11; the first American publication was in Uncle Scrooge #289, in December 1994.

Plot
Scrooge has travelled back to Scotland to help his family save the McDuck castle. During his dramatic fight against the clan's nemesis, the Whiskervilles, Scrooge again gets some help from the ghost of Sir Quackly McDuck, however, this leads to Scrooge falling into the moat and becoming unconscious. He dreams that he has died and gone to "McDuck Heaven", where his forefathers are playing golf on clouds. They decide to give him another chance in life. When he wakes up, Scrooge can't get up as he is weighed down by a suit of armor. He uses his first coin to unscrew its bolts. He then chases off the Whiskervilles, and pays the overdue taxes on the castle with the ten thousand dollars he got from selling a mine, just before coming back to Scotland.

At morning, Scrooge and his father looks out over Dismal Downs, where a rainbow is, and Scrooge decides to make his fortune again.

External links

The New Laird of Castle Mcduck on Duckman

Fiction set in 1885
1993 in comics
Donald Duck comics by Don Rosa
Comics set in the 19th century
Comics set in Scotland
Disney comics stories
Works set in castles
The Life and Times of Scrooge McDuck